Copper(I) thiophene-2-carboxylate or CuTC is a coordination complex derived from copper and thiophene-2-carboxylic acid. It is used as a reagent  to promote the Ullmann reaction between aryl halides.

References 

Thiophenes
Copper(I) compounds
Reagents for organic chemistry